Endowment for Middle East Truth (EMET) is a Washington, DC-based think tank and policy center with a pro-Israel stance that works to promote their views in media coverage of the Arab–Israeli conflict in the Middle East

History
The organization holds seminars on topics related to the Middle East and the Arab–Israeli Conflict In 2008, these seminars were sponsored by the Adelson Family Foundation under the title "Dr. Miriam and Sheldon G. Adelson Policy Seminar Series".

In 2008 it was involved in the distribution in cooperation with The Clarion Fund and Aish HaTorah of over 20 million DVDs of the film Obsession: Radical Islam's War Against the West in swing states prior to the 2008 US Presidential election.

EMET conducted a short campaign to prevent Mosab Hassan Yousef, a former Israeli spy and author of Son of Hamas from being deported from the United States. Mosab publicly thanked the organization following his immigration hearing, saying "I am especially grateful to Sarah Stern, president of the Endowment for Middle Eastern Truth. Today’s blessings would not have happened without her and this amazing organization."

According to The Jerusalem Post, EMET was responsible for initiating a bipartisan congressional letter to Attorney General Eric Holder on the subject of the U.S. Department of Justice's Office of Justice for Victims of Overseas Terrorism, accusing the office of failing to serve American citizens in Israel who were victims of Palestinian terrorist attacks. The letter was sponsored by Democratic Congressman Howard Berman and Republican Congressman Joe Walsh, and 52 co-sponsors, who joined in demanding the Attorney General pursue indictments against Palestinian terrorists released by Israel in the Gilad Shalit prisoner exchange.

Board
Past and present Advisory Board members include Sarah Stern, Jeane Kirkpatrick, Yoram Ettinger, Lenny Ben-David, Daniel Pipes, Meyrav Wurmser, David Wurmser, Frank Gaffney, James Woolsey, Caroline Glick and Larry Greenfield.

References

Non-governmental organizations involved in the Israeli–Palestinian conflict